Patterson is an unincorporated community in Buchanan County, Virginia, United States. Patterson had a post office from September 11, 1936, to July 27, 1991.

The Patterson post office was established in 1936. The community was named for the Patterson brothers.

References

Unincorporated communities in Buchanan County, Virginia
Unincorporated communities in Virginia